Morris King Thompson (born 1955 in Cleveland, Mississippi) is the eleventh and current bishop of the Episcopal Diocese of Louisiana.

Education
Thompson grew up as a Presbyterian. After high school he enlisted for two years in the United States Marine Corps after which he graduated from Mississippi State University. Morris attended seminary at the Southern Baptist Theological Seminary in Louisville, Kentucky, where he graduated with a Master in Divinity degree with an emphasis on pastoral care and counseling. Later he attended the University of Mississippi Medical Center where he did a year residency of clinical pastoral education.

Ministry
Thompson was ordained as a Southern Baptist minister in 1981. After his conversion to the Episcopal Church he was ordained deacon in December 1990 and a priest in June 1991. He served as associate rector of St James's Church in Jackson, Mississippi. In 1997 he was appointed Dean of Christ Church Cathedral in Lexington, Kentucky.

Episcopacy
Thompson was elected bishop of Louisiana on December 5, 2009. He was consecrated bishop on May 8, 2010, by Presiding Bishop Katharine Jefferts Schori in Christ Church Cathedral, New Orleans. He was seated as bishop on May 13.

See also
 List of Episcopal bishops of the United States
 Historical list of the Episcopal bishops of the United States

References

External links 
 Diocesan website

Living people
American Episcopalians
Bishops in Louisiana
1955 births
People from Cleveland, Mississippi
Military personnel from Mississippi
Converts from Presbyterianism
Converts to Anglicanism from Baptist denominations
Episcopal bishops of Louisiana